The Witcher is a comic book series that has been published by the American publisher Dark Horse Comics since 2014. It is based on The Witcher media franchise of CD Projekt.

The stories presented in the series are mostly originals, written not by Andrzej Sapkowski but by other writers; the exception being volume 2, Fox Children, which adapted a story from the anthology Season of Storms. The first issue debuted in 2014, with story by Paul Tobin. Although Dark Horse Comics is an American publisher, a significant proportion of artists involved in the project have been Polish. In particular, volume 4 (Of Flesh and Flame) was both written and illustrated solely by Polish artists.

It is the second The Witcher comic book series, following the Polish series published in 1993–1995.

Reception 
In 2014, Jesse Schedeen reviewed issue 1 of the first volume (House of Glass) for IGN, noting that while the story "doesn't stand out as being remarkably different from other violent fantasy comics, it's definitely an enjoyable read that requires no familiarity with the source material".

In 2015, Charlie Hall reviewed the issue 1 of the second volume (Fox Children) for Polygon, writing that the series has the potential to explore "moral ambiguity" which the franchise is known for. Torin Chambers at Bloody Disgusting! wrote that the issue is worth recommending, although it would have benefited from an explanatory page for those less familiar with the universe. Likewise, Joie Martin at he Geek Initiative agreed that given the interesting cliffhanger, those who read the first issue will likely want to pick up the next one.

In 2017, Donna-Lyn Washington in her review of volume 3 (Curse of Crows) for the Review Fix concluded that the book is a good story "told in a way that wants you to seek out everything related to this character". The issue was also reviewed that year by Dana Folkard for Impulse Gamer, who called it "an engaging and exciting read". Jason Segarra at AIPT was less impressed, describing it as "a fine story, just not a great one", and noting that it feels like a forgettable sidequest.

In 2018, Ricardo Serrano Denis reviewed the first issue of volume 4 (Of Flesh and Flame) for The Beat. He praised the comic for "one of the truest and most genuine game to comic transitions in recent memory", although he noted that the comic is perhaps less accessible to casual readers than the previous three volumes, and seems to aim more at fans of the series already familiar with the franchise. The issue was also positively reviewed by Patrick Hellen at AIPT, who noted that "this is a great start to a new limited series". On the other hand, Tomasz Gardziński writing for Polish magazine Spider's Web was much more critical, calling it disappointing both when it comes to art and plot.

In 2019, Jody Macgregor reviewing The Witcher comics for PC Gamer, wrote that "Andrzej Sapkowski's books survived being adapted for games and for TV and they make for pretty decent comic books as well". She also ranked the released comics (both from Dark Horse as well as those published by CD Projekt independently); for the Dark Horse works available in time of writing she ranked them worst to best as: House of Glass (volume 1), Of Flesh and Flame (volume 4), Fox Children (volume 2) and, best, Curse of Crows (volume 3). A year later, Nick Smith reviewing the Omnibus Edition Volume One, which collects the first three volumes as well as a short story previously published by CD Projekt, gave it 4 out 5 stars, noting that the fans of The Witcher universe "will really enjoy the book", but that it also "stands on it own" for the casual readers.

In 2020, Matthew Aguilar in a capsule review for Comics called the first issue of volume 5 (Fading Memories) "another excellent addition to the franchise" giving it a score of 5 out of 5. Calum Petrie writing for Flickering Myth gave the issue a score of 9 out of 10, concluding that "this is one of the strongest first issues I have come across". The issue was also praised by Jonathan Brown at Monkeys Fighting Robots who noted that all readers, both fans of The Witcher universe as well as those new to the universe, "will adore this comic". Tomasz Gardziński writing for Polish magazine Spider's Web called the volume an interesting experiment, a psychological thriller worth reading at least once, praising the author for ambition in taking the story in interesting and novel directions, but criticizing the story for a number of plot holes and characters, for acting irrationally. The volume was also reviewed by Bartłomiej Romanek for Polish newspaper Dziennik Zachodni; Romanek positively reviewed the artwork and the story, but also noted that the book is "heavy" and quite different from most prior works in The Witcher universe, focusing on psychology more than on slaying fantasy monsters, and  therefore it may disappoint some fans which expected something similar to what they are familiar with and focused on action instead of introspection.

In 2021, Mark Scott at BIG COMIC PAGE reviewed the first volume of volume 6 (Witch's Lament) as average, praising the story but criticizing the inconsistent quality of artwork, giving the issue 3/5 score. Zwierzchowski praised Sztybor's plots for not repeating old motives, like those of Tobin's or Motyka's, but by bravely – and according to the reviewer, successfully – going into uncharted territories. On the other hand, Cian Maher, reviewing Witch's Lament for TheGamer, criticized the book for changing Geralt of Rivia's character too far.

Publications

Issues

Collections

References 

Polish comics titles
2014 comics debuts
The Witcher
Dark Horse Comics
Comics based on novels
Fantasy comics